The open hatch bulk carrier, often referred to as OHBC or conbulker, is designed to offer direct access to the hold through cargo hatches which extend the full width of the vessel. As a result, large cargo units can be lowered into place. If it is possible, the holds or hatches are designed around standard cargo unit sizes. Sometimes a gantry crane is fitted. There is special attention for cargo-handling shipping gear. These conbulkers are expensive because there is extra steel necessary to widen the hatches. This is crucial to provide strength. The open hatches are useful for forest products, such as pre-slung timber and logs. The heavy units are more easy to handle than in a conventional bulk carrier. The open hatch bulk carriers can also be used to carry containers on the outward leg, and dry bulk on the return leg. The first open hatch bulk carrier was built in 1962, for the use of paper trade.

References

+
Ship types